Megacephala regalis is a species of tiger beetle in the subfamily Cicindelinae that was described by Boheman in 1848, and has had many putative subspecies named.

References

regalis
Beetles described in 1848